The 2022–23 Vermont Catamounts women's basketball team will represent the University of Vermont during the 2022–23 NCAA Division I women's basketball season. The Catamounts, led by fourth head coach Alisa Kresge, play their home games in the Patrick Gym are members in the America East Conference.

Roster

Schedule

|-
!colspan=9 style=| Exhibition

|-
!colspan=9 style=| Non-conference regular season

|-
!colspan=9 style=| America East regular season

|-
!colspan=9 style=| America East Women's Tournament

|-
!colspan=9 style=| NCAA tournament

See also
 2022–23 Vermont Catamounts men's basketball team

References

Vermont
Vermont Catamounts women's basketball seasons
Vermont Catamounts women's basketball
Vermont Catamounts women's basketball
Vermont